Fabulous Phineas is an album by American jazz pianist Phineas Newborn Jr. recorded in 1958 and released on the RCA Victor label.

Reception
The Allmusic review awarded the album 3 stars.

Track listing
All compositions by Phineas Newborn Jr. except as indicated
 "Sweet Lorraine" (Cliff Burwell, Mitchell Parish) – 4:30
 "What's New?" (Johnny Burke, Bob Haggart) – 4:05
 "Pamela" – 4:40
 "45° Angle" (Denzil Best) – 5:51
 "No Moon at All" (Redd Evans, Dave Mann) – 4:34
 "I'll Remember April" (Gene DePaul, Patricia Johnston, Don Raye) – 7:41
 "Cherokee" (Ray Noble) – 4:50
 "Back Home" – 5:18

Personnel
Phineas Newborn Jr. – piano
Calvin Newborn – guitar (tracks 1, 3–6 & 8)
George Joyner – bass (tracks 1, 3–6 & 8)
Denzil Best – drums  (tracks 1, 3–6 & 8)

References

RCA Records albums
Phineas Newborn Jr. albums
1958 albums